The  was a professional wrestling event promoted by World Wonder Ring Stardom. It was the first from the promotion's 10th Anniversary celebration line of events, as well as the promotion's first pay-per-view of 2021. It took place on January 17, 2021 in Tokyo, Japan, at the Korakuen Hall with a limited attendance due in part to the ongoing COVID-19 pandemic at the time.

Storylines
The show featured seven professional wrestling matches that resulted from scripted storylines, where wrestlers portrayed villains, heroes, or less distinguishable characters in the scripted events that built tension and culminated in a wrestling match or series of matches. The event's press conference was held online on January 13, 2021 and broadcast live on Stardom's YouTube channel.

Event
The pay-per-view kicked off with Saya Iida successfully retaining the Future of Stardom Championship over Cosmic Angels member and one third of the Artist of Stardom Champions, Unagi Sayaka. The second match saw Natsupoi defeating Konami by disqualification after the latter attacked her with an illegal chair. After her win, Natsupoi challenged AZM for the High Speed Championship. Giulia retained the Wonder of Stardom Championship over Oedo Tai's leader Natsuko Tora in a match what looked to be like a hardcore match but still being sanctioned as only a "no disqualification one". Both Giulia and Tora were allowed to use weapons such as chairs, tables and bricks. The main event portraited the confrontation between Utami Hayashishita and Maika for the World of Stardom Championship which solded with Hayashishita retaining over Donna Del Mondo's member. Hayashishita's Queen's Quest stablemate Saya Kamitani stepped up as her new title challenger for Stardom All Star Dream Cinderella on March 3, 2021.

Results

References

External links
Page Stardom World

2021 in professional wrestling
2021 in Tokyo
Professional wrestling in Tokyo
World Wonder Ring Stardom shows
World Wonder Ring Stardom